Eric Server (born December 4, 1944 in Santa Monica, California) is an American television actor, best known for providing the voice of computer brain Dr. Theopolis in the 1979 TV series Buck Rogers in the 25th Century. From 1979 to 1981 he appeared as Lt. Jim Steiger in 17 episodes of B.J. and the Bear.

He guest-starred in the Star Trek: Deep Space Nine episode "The Circle" and in the Battlestar Galactica episode "The Magnificent Warriors". He also appeared as a police officer in the pilot episode of The Incredible Hulk. Server also appeared in two more episodes of The Incredible Hulk as a race car driver in the season 2 episode "Ricky" and as a thief in the Season 3 episode "A Rock and a Hard Place".

Starting in the early 1970s Server had guest roles in a number of network series. The shows he appeared in more than once include Ironside, Barnaby Jones, The Rockford Files, Police Story, The Streets of San Francisco, Hunter, Switch, Emergency!, Lou Grant, Simon & Simon, T.J. Hooker, Murder, She Wrote and L.A. Law.

References

External links

1944 births
Living people
American male television actors
American male voice actors
Male actors from Los Angeles
People from Santa Monica, California